Nils Nilsson (1919–1981) was a Swedish art director.  He worked on the design of film sets on over sixty productions, many of them shot at the Centrumateljéerna Studios of Sandrews in Stockholm.

Selected filmography

 Live Dangerously (1944)
 Youth in Danger (1946)
 Dynamite (1947)
 Crime in the Sun (1947)
 The Sixth Commandment (1947)
 Loffe as a Millionaire (1948)
 Sunshine (1948)
 She Came Like the Wind (1952)
 All the World's Delights (1953)
 Stupid Bom (1953)
 House of Women (1953)
 The Yellow Squadron (1954)
 Our Father and the Gypsy (1954)
 Storm over Tjurö (1954)
 Taxi 13(1954)
 People of the Finnish Forests (1955)
 Voyage in the Night (1955)
 Whoops! (1955)
 The Girl in the Rain (1955)
 The Stranger from the Sky (1956)
 The Girl in Tails (1956)
 Laughing in the Sunshine (1956)
 Moon Over Hellesta (1956)
 Stage Entrance (1956)
 Seventeen Years Old (1957)
 A Dreamer's Journey (1957)
 Guest at One's Own Home (1957)
 Mother Takes a Vacation (1957)
 Musik ombord (1958)
 The Koster Waltz (1958)
 Line Six (1958)
 Terror in the Midnight Sun (1959)
 Åsa-Nisse as a Policeman (1960)

References

Bibliography
 Frank, Alan G. The Science Fiction and Fantasy Film Handbook. Barnes & Noble Books, 1982.

External links

1919 births
1981 deaths
Swedish art directors